Oh In-pyo (born 18 March 1997) is a South Korean professional footballer who plays as a midfielder for Ulsan Hyundai.

Club career
On 4 January 2022, Oh returned to Ulsan Hyundai.

References

1997 births
Living people
South Korean footballers
Association football midfielders
South Korea under-20 international footballers
Ulsan Hyundai FC players
LASK players
FC Juniors OÖ players
K League 1 players
Austrian Football Bundesliga players
Austrian Regionalliga players
2. Liga (Austria) players
South Korean expatriate footballers
South Korean expatriate sportspeople in Austria
Expatriate footballers in Austria
People from Anyang, Gyeonggi
Sportspeople from Gyeonggi Province